The Swedish Open is an open badminton tournament that is annually held since 2018, previously from 1956 to 2000 after which the organizer, Svenska Badmintonförbundet, could no longer find a suitable sponsor. To some extent it has been replaced by the Swedish International Stockholm tournament.

Between 2004 and 2017 it was replaced by Swedish International / Swedish Masters Badminton Championships. The name is re-used since 2018.

Winners

Performances by nation

References

External links

Badminton tournaments in Sweden
1956 establishments in Sweden
Recurring sporting events established in 1956